MCBC may refer to:
 Merton College Boat Club, Oxford, England
 Mansfield College Boat Club, Oxford, England
 Magdalen College Boat Club, Oxford, England
 The MC Bat Commander, Christian Jacobs
 Molson Coors Brewing Company, a North American brewing company encompassing Molson and Coors